Manderley Castle, formerly "Victoria Castle" and "Ayesha Castle", is a large  castellated Irish mansion built in Victorian style, in Killiney, County Dublin, Ireland. It is currently owned by the singer Enya.

Features
From the roof of the crenellated turret of the castle, it is possible to see beyond the Irish coast as far eastward as Wales. A "secret" tunnel at the bottom of the garden originally gave access to Killiney beach but now is sealed off.

According to blueprints submitted in 1988, the owners sought permission to convert the existing stable house into attached living quarters. Permission was granted and the stable became an attached guest house, art room, exercise room and lounge area complete with staff quarters. According to the same submission, Manderley Castle sits at 1021.336 sq. meters, or 11,000 sq. feet in combined floor space.

History
Judge Robert Warren built Victoria Castle in 1840 to commemorate Queen Victoria's accession to the throne.  The interior was gutted by fire in 1928, then restored by Sir Thomas Power of the whiskey distillery family. He renamed the mansion "Ayesha Castle", after the goddess who rose from the flames in Rider Haggard's novel She.  In 1995, the Aylmer family decided to turn Ayesha Castle into a place of tourist interest, "conver[ting ] existing stables to a ground floor apartment and a first floor craft room".  The Stable Gallery was established there, and a number of artists displayed their pictures.

Irish musician Enya bought the castle in 1997 for €3.8 million, reportedly outbidding Michael Flatley, who also viewed the house. Based on her interest in Daphne du Maurier's Rebecca, Enya renamed the castle "Manderley" for the fictional house that plays a central role in the 1938 novel.

Security
Despite these changes, around mid-August 2005, there were two separate security breaches while Enya was at the castle (her security system includes a panic room).

References

Buildings and structures in Dún Laoghaire–Rathdown
Enya
Houses in the Republic of Ireland
Castles in Dún Laoghaire–Rathdown
Killiney